Halls is an unincorporated community in Bartow County, in the U.S. state of Georgia.

History
The community (previously called Hall's Mill and Hall's Station) was named for a railroad agent, L. H. Hall. A post office called Hall's Mill was in operation from 1868 until 1895.

References

Unincorporated communities in Bartow County, Georgia
Unincorporated communities in Georgia (U.S. state)